Allium delicatulum is a Eurasian species of onion native to European Russia, Western Siberia, Xinjiang, and Kazakhstan. It grows in open grasslands and deserts.

Allium delicatulum produces round to egg-shaped bulbs up to 15 mm across. Scapes are up to 25 cm tall, round in cross-section. Leaves are round and hollow, shorter than the scapes. Flowers have white or pink tepals with dark red midveins.

References

delicatulum
Onions
Flora of Xinjiang
Flora of Russia
Flora of Kazakhstan
Plants described in 1830